The FIS Nordic World Ski Championships 2003 took place February 18 – March 1, 2003 in Val di Fiemme, Italy for a second time (1991). The ski jumping team normal hill held in 2001 was not held at this championships while the women's 30 km returned after being cancelled in the previous championships due to extremely cold weather. Additionally the pursuit races went from separate races run on the same day (combined) to Skiathlon races.

Men's cross-country

1.5 km individual sprint 
February 26, 2003

15 km classical 
February 21, 2003

10 km + 10 km double pursuit 
February 23, 2003

30 km classical mass start 
February 19, 2003

50 km freestyle 
March 1, 2003

4 × 10 km relay
February 25, 2003

Women's cross-country

1.5 km individual sprint 
February 26, 2003

10 km classical 
February 20. 2003

5 km + 5 km double pursuit 
February 22, 2003

Sachenbacher beat Zavyalova in a photo finish to earn the silver medal.

15 km classical mass start 
February 18, 2003

30 km freestyle
February 28, 2003

4 × 5 km relay
February 24, 2003

The Finnish relay team finished second, but was disqualified when Kaisa Varis tested positive for doping.

Men's Nordic combined

7.5 km sprint
February 28, 2003

Spillane is the first American to win a gold medal in the FIS Nordic World Ski Championships. Ackermann beat Gottwald at the line to earn the silver medal.

15 km Individual Gundersen
February 21, 2003

4 × 5 km team
February 24, 2003

Men's ski jumping

Individual normal hill 
February 28, 2003

Individual large hill 
February 22, 2003

Team large hill
February 23, 2003

Medal table
Medal winners by nation.
The host country, Italy, did not get any medals.

References
 FIS 2003 Cross country results
 FIS 2003 Nordic combined results
 FIS 2003 Ski jumping results
 2003 FIS Nordic Ski World Championships official website

FIS Nordic World Ski Championships
2003 in Nordic combined
2003 in cross-country skiing
2003 in ski jumping
2003 in Italian sport
History of Trentino
Sport in Trentino
Cross-country skiing competitions in Italy
February 2003 sports events in Europe
March 2003 sports events in Europe
Nordic skiing competitions in Italy